Amin ud Din Khan (born 1 December 1960) is a Pakistani jurist who has been Justice of Supreme Court of Pakistan since 22 October 2019. He served on the Lahore High Court from 12 May 2011 to 22 October 2019.

References

1960 births
Living people
Judges of the Lahore High Court
Pakistani judges
Justices of the Supreme Court of Pakistan